Purusiella is a genus of longhorn beetles of the subfamily Lamiinae, containing the following species:

 Purusiella hippomontanensis Dalens, Touroult & Tavakilian, 2010
 Purusiella wappesi (Martins & Galileo, 2004)

References

Hemilophini